The Casbah (qaṣba, meaning citadel) is the citadel of Algiers in Algeria and the traditional quarter clustered around it. In 1992, the United Nations Educational, Scientific and Cultural Organization (UNESCO) proclaimed Kasbah of Algiers a World Cultural Heritage site, as "There are the remains of the citadel, old mosques and Ottoman-style palaces as well as the remains of a traditional urban structure associated with a deep-rooted sense of community."

Etymology
More generally, a kasbah is the walled citadel of many North African cities and towns. The name made its way into English from French in the late 19th century (the Oxford English Dictionary states 1895), and can be spelled "kasbah" or "casbah."

History 
 
The Casbah of Algiers is founded on the ruins of old Icosium in the 10th century. It was a city built on a hill, stretching towards the sea, divided into the "High city" and the "Low city". One finds there masonry and mosques dating from the 17th century: Ketchaoua Mosque (built in 1794 by the Dey Baba Hassan) flanked by two minarets; Djama’a al-Djedid (1660, at the time of the Ottomans) with its large finished ovoid cupola points some and its four cupolas; Djamaâ el Kebir (the oldest of the mosques), built by Almoravid ruler Yusuf ibn Tashfin; and Ali Bitchin Mosque (Raïs, 1623). The Casbah also contained several palaces, including Dar Aziza, Dar Mustapha Pacha, Palace of the Dey, and Dar Hassan Pacha which was built in 1791 to house the Pasha, who lived there for eight years.

In 1839, shortly after the French conquest, the French governor moved into Dar Hassan Pacha. In 1860, Napoleon III and Eugénie de Montijo visited. Before French rule, the casbah contained around 13 Jama Masjids, 109 mosques, 32 mausoleums and 12 Zawiyas, total of 166 religious-related buildings. However, the majority of these religious buildings were destroyed during the occupation. In 1862, there were only nine Jama Masjids, 19 mosques, 15 mausoleums and five Zawiyas left. Many mosques such as Ketchauoua Mosque and Berrani Mosque were converted into building with non-Islamic purposes, such as military barracks and churches.

The Casbah played a central role during the Algerian War of Independence (1954–1962). During the early years of the war, the Casbah was the epicenter of the insurgency planning of the National Liberation Front (FLN), from which it planned and executed attacks against French citizens and law enforcement agents in Algeria at the time. In order to counter their efforts, the French authorities launched operations in the Casbah during the Battle of Algiers.

Current condition 
The ANSS, the conservation agency of the Algerian government, reported that 373 buildings in the Casbah have collapsed. Of the 1816 buildings that remain, 40% are ruined or in a critical state, and 10% are boarded up.

Reuters reported in August 2008 that the Casbah was in a state of neglect and certain areas were at risk of collapse.

Algerian authorities list age, neglect and overpopulation as the principal contributors to the degeneration. Overpopulation makes the problem especially difficult to solve because of the effort it would take to relocate the residents. Estimates range from 40,000 to 70,000 people, although it is difficult to be certain due to the number of squatters in vacant buildings. One reason that the government wants to improve the condition of the Casbah is that it is a potential hideout for criminals and terrorists. In the late 1950s and during the civil insurrection and struggle against French colonial rule it was the hideout for the National Liberation Army (Algeria).

Preservationist Belkacem Babaci described the situation as difficult, but not insurmountable, saying: “I still believe it’s possible to save it, but you need to empty it and you need to find qualified people who will respect the style, the materials. It’s a huge challenge.” Restoration projects have been plagued by delays and endemic corruption.

Climate change 

Since the Casbah of Algiers is a coastal landmark, it is vulnerable to sea level rise. In 2022, the IPCC Sixth Assessment Report included it in the list of African cultural sites which would be threatened by flooding and coastal erosion by the end of the century, but only if climate change followed RCP 8.5, which is the scenario of high and continually increasing greenhouse gas emissions associated with a warming of over 4°C., and is no longer considered very likely. The other, more plausible scenarios result in lower warming levels and consequently lower sea level rise: yet sea level rise would continue for about 10,000 years in all of them. Even if the warming is limited to 1.5°C, global sea level rise is still expected to exceed  after 2000 years (and higher warming levels will see larger increases by then), consequently exceeding 2100 levels of sea level rise under RCP 8.5 (~ with a range of ) well before the year 4000. Thus, it is a matter of time before the Casbah of Algiers is threatened by water levels, unless it can be protected by adaptation efforts such as sea walls.

In popular culture
The Casbah of Algiers plays a central role in the 1937 French film Pépé le Moko and the 1938 American film Algiers, in which the noted jewel thief Pepe le Moko, played by Jean Gabin in the French version and Charles Boyer in the American version hide there after a heist in France, and he becomes a local leader, but as time passes, he begins to feel trapped in the district. Although in the American film,  Boyer never said to costar Hedy Lamarr "Come with me to ze Casbah," this line was in the Hollywood movie trailer, and it would stick with him, thanks to generations of impressionists and Looney Tunes parodies. 
Boyer's role as Pepe Le Moko was already world-famous when animator Chuck Jones based the character of Pepé Le Pew, the romantic skunk introduced in 1945's  Warner Bros. cartoon Odor-able Kitty, on Boyer, his voice – imitated by Mel Blanc – and the catch phrase "Come with me to ze Casbah" from  his most well-known performance.

Notable people
 Abd al-Rahman al-Tha'alibi (1384-1479)
 Abdelhalim Bensmaia (1866-1933)
 Mohamed Charef (1908-2011)
 Brahim Boushaki (1912-1997)
 Abderrahmane Taleb (1930-1958)
 Djamila Bouhired (born 1935)
 Djamila Boupacha (born 1938)
 Mustapha Toumi (1937-2013)

See also 
 Pépé le Moko
 Casbah City (TV series)
 Medina quarter
 List of cultural assets of Algeria

References

External links 

 Images of Algiers Casbah in Manar al-Athar digital heritage archive resource

 
 

 
Maghreb
Ottoman architecture in Algeria
Arabic architecture
Communes of Algiers Province
Buildings and structures in Algiers
World Heritage Sites in Algeria